Herina nigrina is a species of ulidiid or picture-winged fly in the genus Herina of the family Ulidiidae found in most of Western Europe.

References

Ulidiidae
Insects described in 1826
Diptera of Europe
Diptera of Africa